Interstate 81 (I-81) is a part of the Interstate Highway System that runs from I-40 at Dandridge, Tennessee, to the Thousand Islands Bridge at Wellesley Island in New York, beyond which the short  Ontario Highway 137 (Highway 137) links it to Highway 401. In the US state of New York, I-81 extends  from the Pennsylvania state line southeast of Binghamton to the Canadian border at Wellesley Island northwest of Alexandria Bay. The freeway runs north–south through Central New York, serving the cities of Binghamton, Syracuse, and Watertown. It passes through the Thousand Islands in its final miles and crosses two bridges, both part of the series of bridges known as the Thousand Islands Bridge.

South of Watertown, I-81 closely parallels US Route 11 (US 11), the main north–south highway in Central New York prior to the construction of I-81. At Watertown, US 11 turns northeastward to head across New York's North Country region while I-81 continues on a generally northward track to the Canadian border. From there, the road continues into the province of Ontario as Highway 137, a short route leading north to the nearby Highway 401.

The portion of I-81 in New York was originally developed as the Penn-Can Highway, one of four expressways proposed by the state in 1953. It was added to the Interstate Highway System and designated I-81 in 1957 and constructed in sections over the course of the next decade. The first segment was completed in the mid-1950s, running from Tully to the southern edge of Syracuse. The last piece opened in the late 1960s, linking Marathon to Whitney Point.

Route description

Southern Tier
The freeway heads northwest from the state line, running through a valley surrounding the Susquehanna River in the town of Kirkwood. This stretch of I-81 closely parallels US 11, continuing a trend that originally began at I-81's southern terminus in eastern Tennessee. Both roads head across relatively undeveloped areas along the eastern riverbank to the outskirts of Binghamton, where I-81 merges with New York State Route 17 (NY 17; Future I-86) in an industrial area east of the city.

Just west of the Brandywine Highway junction, I-81 and NY 17 cross the Chenango River as they split at a directional T interchange comprising part of an S-curve in NY 17 known locally as Kamikaze Curve. While NY 17 heads west into the curve, I-81 proceeds northward along the west bank of the river, connecting to US 11 and passing by SUNY Broome Community College on its way into the suburban town of Chenango. Continuing on, the freeway intersects US 11 a second time before leaving the banks of the Susquehanna River and proceeding generally northwestward into increasingly rural areas of the Southern Tier.

Continuing on, I-81 begins to follow the Tioughnioga River, a tributary of the Susquehanna, as it bypasses the nearby village of Lisle to the east. While US 11 runs across the base of a valley flanking the river, the freeway proceeds along the valley's eastern edge, overlooking the valley road on its way to the Broome–Cortland county line. Both routes cross the border at points just yards apart, beginning their transition from the Southern Tier region to Central New York. About  from the county line, I-81 encounters the village of Marathon, situated inside the river valley at the junction of US 11 and NY 221. Along the way, I-81 passes between the Tuller Hill and Hoxie Gorge state forests, located near Messengerville on the western and eastern sides of the highway, respectively.

Cortland to Syracuse

The rural, northwestward trend ends west of the village of McGraw at a junction with NY 41, the primary east–west (signed north–south) road through the community. NY 41 continues west from the exit for a short distance to meet US 11, and the two routes become concurrent for the next . I-81, US 11, and NY 41 all head westward from this point, passing a handful of scattered businesses to reach the eastern edge of the nearby city of Cortland. While US 11 and NY 41 continue directly into the city, I-81 bypasses it to the northeast. As such, it crosses only moderately developed areas on the periphery of Cortland. The road connects to downtown Cortland by way of an exit with NY 13, a north–south route serving most of Central New York. Near the exit, the Tioughnioga River splits into two branches, with NY 13 following the east branch to the northeast and I-81 proceeding westward along the west branch.

North of downtown Cortland, I-81 makes a 90-degree turn to the north, matching a similar curve in the course of the nearby river. This track brings the freeway to the suburban village of Homer, which I-81 connects to via exit 12. The trumpet interchange feeds into a long east–west ramp linking the highway to the parallel US 11, NY 41, and NY 281, another parallel road farther west. NY 41 leaves US 11 in Homer, and I-81, US 11, and NY 281 proceed slightly northeastward across a low-lying, undeveloped area in an otherwise hilly region of Cortland County. Just south of the Onondaga County line, I-81 directly meets NY 281 as it crosses from the western side of the freeway to the eastern edge. They meet one final time across the county line near the village of Tully, where NY 281 ends as I-81 intersects NY 80 and NY 11A. The west branch of the Tioughnioga River also terminates here, flowing into Tully Lake at the county line.

The amount of development along the freeway slowly increases as it heads north through the county. In LaFayette, I-81 meets with US 20, one of a handful of east–west roads spanning the width of the state. Continuing on, I-81 and US 11 pass east of Onondaga Reservation, connecting once again at exit 16 before entering the city of Syracuse. At this point, the forests that had lined both roads give way to the dense residential neighborhoods that comprise the city's southern half. I-81 itself proceeds due north toward downtown on an embankment, running alongside the New York, Susquehanna and Western Railway (NYSW) and passing adjacent to Oakwood Cemetery. The surrounding area transitions from mostly residential to mostly commercial at the north edge of the cemetery, where I-81 passes west of the campuses of Syracuse University and State University of New York College of Environmental Science and Forestry.

Syracuse and Oswego County
West of Syracuse University, the NYSW turns west to pass under I-81. At this point, the embankment gives way to an elevated highway carrying I-81 through downtown right next to the State University of New York Upstate Medical University (SUNY Upstate). The road separates the 15th Ward on its west side from Syracuse University and the area's hospitals on its east side; it also visually hangs over the predominantly residential 15th Ward. Farther north, the density of the commercial districts adjacent to the highway continue to increase as the road enters Downtown Syracuse. For roughly a half-mile, I-81 heads east–west, running alongside I-690 and connecting to the highway by way of a series of closely spaced ramps. Like I-81, the incomplete interchange is entirely elevated, passing over parts of several downtown blocks. Past I-690, I-81 transitions from an elevated road to a subsurface highway as it cuts across the north half of downtown and proceeds northwest past an old industrial area that was once Syracuse's Inner Harbor. The elevated portion in Syracuse is expected to reach the end of its useful life in 2017.

The cut eventually brings the freeway to the southeastern tip of Onondaga Lake, where I-81 ascends in elevation once again at a network of interchanges with NY 370 and a handful of nearby streets. The series of junctions serve Destiny USA, the area's largest mall; NBT Bank Stadium, the home of the Syracuse Mets; and the William F. Walsh Regional Transportation Center (RTC), Syracuse's bus and train station. I-81 subsequently passes over CSX Transportation's Mohawk Subdivision rail line, which serves the RTC. North of the rail overpass, the road finally returns to ground level as it heads northeastward through Syracuse's residential northern suburbs. In Salina, I-81 meets the New York State Thruway (I-90) at exit 25A and connects to Syracuse Hancock International Airport at exit 27.

While I-481 continues northwest from North Syracuse as NY 481, I-81 travels north through residential areas of gradually decreasing density. Just north of the junction with I-481 and NY 481, the freeway passes east of the former Penn-Can Mall, the largest commercial parcel in the area. I-81's first junction north of Syracuse is in the town of Cicero, where it connects to NY 31, another regionally important highway. North of here, US 11 begins to closely parallel I-81 once again, rejoining the highway's vicinity after following an erratic alignment through Syracuse. The two roads run across relatively flat and increasingly undeveloped land to Brewerton, a hamlet adjacent to where Oneida Lake empties into the Oneida River. While US 11 runs through the community, I-81 bypasses it to the east, offering unobstructed views of the lake as it crosses the lake outlet and enters Oswego County.

On the opposite riverbank, I-81 initially runs past a line of lakefront houses and cottages; however, it soon enters a large marshy area named Big Bay Swamp. The wetlands reach as far north as Central Square, a village just west of I-81's interchange with NY 49. For most of the next , I-81 runs north across a mixture of swamps and fields, both undeveloped and fairly level in elevation. Along this stretch, the freeway links to two more major routes: NY 69 and NY 104. The highway eventually reaches the village of Pulaski, where it reconnects to NY 13 at a partial interchange east of the village center. Another substantial stretch of open, rolling fields brings the route to Sandy Creek, where it connects to County Route 15 (CR 15), a highway designated NY 288 during the 1930s.

North Country
Past Sandy Creek, I-81 proceeds into Jefferson County, where it continues to travel across rural, undeveloped areas with only gentle elevation changes. US 11 crosses I-81 for the last time just north of the county line, connecting to the freeway and switching from the highway's west side to its east side. As a result, I-81 now passes west of several villages and large hamlets, all located directly on US 11. Connections to the communities are made by the primary east–west highways serving them, namely CR 90 for Mannsville, NY 193 for Pierrepont Manor, NY 178 for Adams, and NY 177 for Adams Center. At Adams Center, both I-81 and US 11 take on a more northeasterly routing, bringing them farther inland toward the city of Watertown. The final exit before the city itself leads to NY 232, a short connector between I-81 and Watertown Center, the southern extent of Watertown's suburbs.

The rural surroundings finally end, albeit briefly, in the vicinity of Watertown, where I-81 intersects NY 3 in a commercialized area west of downtown Watertown. All four corners of the junction contain at least one shopping plaza, and the northwestern corner features the sprawling Salmon Run Mall. The commercial development follows I-81 north to its next exit, a diamond interchange with NY 12F near Jefferson Community College. At this point, I-81 turns northeastward, running south of an industrial park and north of the college before crossing the Black River to meet NY 12 in a less developed but still commercialized area north of the city. US 11 and I-81 finally part ways at this point, with I-81 continuing north toward Canada and US 11 heading northeast to serve some of the North Country's northernmost communities.

As the highway leaves the Watertown area, it passes into another area of rolling, open terrain with only pockets of development in the immediate vicinity of the road's interchanges. West of the village, I-81 intersects NY 411, a connector between La Fargeville and NY 37. While NY 37 continues north from Theresa, I-81 turns to the northwest, crossing increasingly isolated areas of the state to reach NY 12 on the south shore of the St. Lawrence River midway between Clayton and Alexandria Bay. From here, the freeway heads into the Thousand Islands on the first of several bridges over the St. Lawrence known collectively as the Thousand Islands Bridge. The long, continuous bridge span between the U.S. mainland and Wellesley Island (one of the archipelago's largest) is one of the few remaining two-lane stretches left on the Interstate Highway System.

In the Thousand Islands, I-81 runs across the sparsely-developed Wellesley Island, initially heading northwest and connecting to a pair of county-maintained roads before turning northeast at the eastern edge of Wellesley Island State Park. The freeway turns one final time near the northern edge of the island, curving back to the northwest at exit 52, the last exit along I-81. For most of its run on Wellesley Island, I-81 runs along or close to the island's edge, permitting views of the St. Lawrence River and some of the area's other islands. Not far from exit 52, an interchange linking the freeway to a paralleling local road, I-81 crosses the International Rift on a  bridge connecting Wellesley Island to Hill Island in Ontario, Canada, terminating at the Canadian border at the bridge's midpoint. From here, the physical road continues north as Highway 137 onto Hill Island, Constance Island, Georgina Island, and the Canadian mainland via the Canadian spans of the Thousand Islands Bridge before finally ending at a trumpet interchange with Highway 401.

History
The Binghamton–Syracuse–Watertown corridor was originally served by NY 2, a route assigned as part of the creation of the modern New York state route system in 1924. It was replaced by US 11 when US Routes were first posted in New York in 1927. In February 1953, New York Governor Thomas E.  Dewey proposed constructing four expressways across the state of New York to supplement the then-under construction New York State Thruway. One of the four proposed highways closely followed US 11, beginning in Binghamton and proceeding generally northward through Central New York to the Canadian border north of Watertown. A connection to the Pennsylvania state line was eventually added to the route, which became known as the Penn-Can Highway. On August 14, 1957, the Penn-Can Highway was included in the Interstate Highway System and designated as part of I-81.

In the mid-1950s, the first section of the highway was completed, connecting Tully (now exit 14) to Nedrow (now exit 16), just south of Syracuse. Another section, extending from North Syracuse (now exit 26) to Brewerton (now exit 31), was opened to traffic in the late 1950s. In the North Country, the first completed section ran from Adams (now exit 41) to Pamelia (now exit 48); it was put into service on October 21, 1959. Extensions of the North Syracuse–Brewerton segment south into Downtown Syracuse (now exit 19) and north to Parish (now exit 33) were completed . The section between modern exits 38 and 41 in southern Jefferson County was finished in November 1961, and the gap between the Syracuse–Parish and Jefferson County segments was filled on December 1, 1961, creating a continuous limited-access highway between Syracuse and Watertown.

I-81 was opened to traffic from the Pennsylvania state line north to NY 17 in Kirkwood in mid-1961, and the piece linking Pamelia to the Canadian border was completed on September 29, 1965. Three more sections of I-81 were finished to traffic in the mid-1960s, completing all of I-81 within the state except for the portion between NY 221 in Marathon and NY 26 in Whitney Point. The Marathon–Whitney Point segment was completed . In Syracuse, part of I-81 was built on an elevated highway, intended to make travel from Downtown Syracuse to Syracuse University faster.

The construction of the I-81 came with much controversy. After the freeway was completed, many neighborhoods were disrupted by the presence of the freeway. One neighborhood in particular, the 15th Ward in Syracuse, was largely replaced by the freeway. This decimated a close-knit Black-American community. When the displaced community attempted to disperse out into the city, white residents fled, reducing the population of the city by 30 percent over 60 years, while the population of the county grew 55 percent.

Future
The section of I-81 that runs through Syracuse is slowly deteriorating and is due to be reconstructed. The New York State Department of Transportation (NYSDOT) has frequently said that I-81 will need to be changed due to its deteriorating condition. One major reason for the urgency of this effort is the condition of the elevated highway and other bridges located on I-81 between the I-481 interchanges on opposite sides of the city, as well as on I-690 in the vicinity of I-81's interchange with the highway. In 2001, Syracuse Common Councillor Van Robinson called for the removal of some elevated portions of I-81 that were blocking Upstate Medical University. He stated that the bridge not only presented a problem sectionalizing the Syracuse area but also it presented a problem for Syracuse University and SUNY Upstate.

In early May 2011, the official process in deciding the future of I-81 was started by two entities: NYSDOT and the Syracuse Metropolitan Transportation Council (SMTC), the region's metropolitan planning organization. NYSDOT is responsible for overseeing the process and, eventually, its construction. SMTC consists of member agencies that have a stake in transportation decisions in Central New York. Both parties have yet to reach a decision, but they hope to eventually reach one that is in the best interest for everyone in the greater Syracuse area. In late March 2011, SMTC and NYSDOT announced the formation of the I-81 Community Liaison Committee (CLC). The CLC is made up of representatives from 37 organizations and will give ideas and point out concerns about the future of I-81 in Syracuse.

On April 22, 2019, NYSDOT selected the "community grid" alternative for reconstructing I-81 through Syracuse. Under this plan, I-81 will be rerouted to bypass Syracuse along the I-481 alignment while the section of I-81 through Syracuse will be designated as a business loop of I-81. This alternative, which is expected to cost between $1.9 billion and $2.2 billion, would tear down the elevated viaduct and reconstruct Almond Street as an at-grade boulevard. Also as a part of this project, both of the interchanges between I-81 and I-481 would be reconstructed to allow I-481 to be converted to I-81. Construction was expected to start in mid-2020 and take five years to complete. However, in May 2021, Governor Andrew Cuomo announced the project would not commence until the following year. At this time, the New York state government allocated $800 million to the "community grid" plan. In preparation for the reconstruction/relocation of I-81 around Syracuse, the American Association of State Highway and Transportation Officials (AASHTO), at its annual Spring Meeting in May 2021, conditionally approved NYSDOT's application to reroute I-81 over I-481 around the east side of Syracuse and redesignate I-81 through Syracuse as I-81 Business (I-81 Bus), pending concurrence from the Federal Highway Administration (FHWA). NYSDOT will renumber I-81 exits from sequential to mile-based along its entire length following the rerouting of I-81 around Syracuse.

Exit list
All exits in New York use sequential numbering

See also

References

External links

The I-81 Challenge website

81
 New York
Transportation in Broome County, New York
Transportation in Cortland County, New York
Transportation in Onondaga County, New York
Transportation in Oswego County, New York
Transportation in Jefferson County, New York
Transportation in Syracuse, New York
Central New York